{{safesubst:#invoke:RfD||2=YOU-CAN-SPAM Act of 2003|month = March
|day =  6
|year = 2023
|time = 21:55
|timestamp = 20230306215556

|content=
REDIRECT CAN-SPAM Act of 2003

}}